A list of films produced in France in 2003.

External links
 2003 in France
 2003 in French television
 French films of 2003 at the Internet Movie Database
French films of 2003 at Cinema-francais.fr

2003
Films
French